Lucey–Driscoll syndrome is an autosomal recessive metabolic disorder affecting enzymes involved in bilirubin metabolism. It is one of several disorders classified as a transient familial neonatal unconjugated hyperbilirubinemia.

Signs and symptoms

Cause
The common cause is congenital, but it can also be caused by maternal steroids passed on through breast milk to the newborn. It is different from breast feeding-associated jaundice (breast-fed infants have higher bilirubin levels than formula-fed ones).

Genetics
A defect in the UGT1A1-gene, also linked to Crigler–Najjar syndrome and Gilbert's syndrome, is responsible for the congenital form of Lucey–Driscoll syndrome.

Diagnosis

Treatment
Treatment is as per neonatal jaundice, and includes phototherapy and exchange transfusions.  If left untreated, Lucey-Driscoll syndrome may lead to seizures, kernicterus, and even death.

Once treated, most patients will have no additional complications.

References

External links 

  - transient familial neonatal hyperbilirubinemia, breast feeding jaundice included

Hepatology
Autosomal recessive disorders
Syndromes
Heme metabolism disorders